Girdwood is a railway point and unincorporated place in geographic Atkinson Township in the Unorganized North Part of Algoma District in northeastern Ontario, Canada. It lies on the Canadian Pacific Railway transcontinental main line between the settlements of Amyot on the line  to the west northwest and Ryerson on the line  to the northeast. Via Rail provides services to Girdwood railway station with the Sudbury – White River train once daily in each direction. Girdwood is adjacent to Tripoli Creek, a tributary of the Magpie River.

References

Communities in Algoma District